This is a list of flag bearers who have represented Bermuda at the Olympics.

Flag bearers carry the national flag of their country at the opening ceremony of the Olympic Games.

See also
Bermuda at the Olympics

References

Bermuda at the Olympics
Bermuda
Olympic